The Album may refer to:
 ABBA: The Album, released in 1977
 The Album (Caravan album), 1980
 The Album (Mantronix album), 1985
 The Album (Cliff Richard album), 1993
 The Album (Haddaway album), 1993
 The Album (Hello Sailor album), 1994
 The Album (Latyrx album), 1997
 The Album (Shane Richie album), 1997
 The Album (The Firm album), 1997
 The Album (Terror Squad album), 1999
 The Album (Dj Shah album), 2000
 The Album (Lil Rob album), 2003
 The Album (The Federation album), 2004
 The Album (Jeckyll & Hyde album), 2007
 The Album (Daniel Schuhmacher album), 2009
 The Album (Achozen album), 2010
 The Album (Aunty Donna album), 2018
 The Album (Teyana Taylor album), 2020
 The Album (Blackpink album), 2020
 The Album (Chase Rice album), 2021
 The Album, a 1993 album by Masters at Work
 The Album, a 1933 novel by Mary Roberts Rinehart
 The Album, a 2003 album by Okamura & Takkyu

See also
 The Albums, a box set of recordings by pop group ABBA released in 2008
 Album (disambiguation)